NIHS  may refer to:

 Northern Islands High School, Wotje, Marshall Islands
 Norwood International High School, Adelaide, South Australia
 Taipei Municipal Nei-Hu Industrial High School, now Taipei Municipal Nei-Hu Vocational High School, Taiwan

See also 
 NIH (disambiguation)